UCD GAA or University College Dublin Gaelic Athletic Association club is a Dublin based Gaelic games club in University College Dublin. The UCD hurling club was founded in 1900 and boasted the mottos "Ad Astra" and "Cothrom Féinne". The first team was an amalgamation of students from UCD and Cecilia St. Although UCD had been playing Gaelic football unofficially since 1900, the official club history began in the season of 1911/1912.

The football club competes in the Sigerson Cup and Higher Education Leagues as well as in the Dublin Senior Football Championship and the O'Byrne Cup. The hurling club competes in the Fitzgibbon Cup and Higher Education Leagues and occasionally in the Dublin Senior Hurling Championship and the Walsh Cup. The Camogie Club competes in the Ashbourne Cup. The ladies Gaelic football team competes in the O'Connor Cup.

Former Dublin footballer Brian Mullins is the director of sport at UCD. Ger Brennan & Josh Warde are currently in charge of all Gaelic games on the UCD campus.

Hurling
UCD won the Leinster Senior Hurling Championship and the All-Ireland representing Dublin as the Collegians in 1917. In the all-Ireland final, the Collegians beat Boherlahan of Tipperary by a score-line of 5–4 to 4–2 at Croke Park. The attendance was 11,000. The Collegians all-Ireland winning team were: T. Daly, J. Ryan, S. Hyde, S. O’Donavon, H. Burke, C. Stuart, J. Phelan, B. Mockler, T. Moore, J. Cleary, F. Burke, M. Neville, M. Hackett, M. Hayes, P. Kenefick. Sub: B. Considine.

More recently, UCD won the 2000, 2004 and 2005 Dublin Senior Hurling Championships and reached the Leinster Senior Club Hurling Championship final on each occasion but were defeated by narrow margins.

In 2004, UCD won the Walsh Cup for the first time when they convincingly beat reigning All-Ireland champions, Kilkenny, by 2–16 to 0–5.

UCD last won the Fitzgibbon Cup in 2001 when they were captained by David Hegarty (Clare). They defeated UCC in the final. Team: Matty White, Robbie Kirwan, DOC O'Connor, Brian Walton, Colm Everard, David Hegarty, Hugh Flannery, Gary Mernagh, Stephen Lucey, Pat Fitzgerald, Sean O'Neill, Redmond Barry, Brendan Murphy, Alan Barry, John Culkin.

Honours

Notable players

 Oisín Gough
 David Hegarty
 Stephen Lucey
 Noel McGrath
 Brendan Murphy
 David O'Callaghan
 David O'Connor
 Liam Rushe

Football

Honours

Notable players

 Brian Dooher
 Cormac McAnallen
 Tony McManus
 Brian Mullins
 Seán Murphy
 Kieran Denvir
 Paddy O'Brien
 John O'Keeffe
 Colm O'Rourke
 Kevin Kilmurray
 John Hegarty, Sigerson Cup winner

See also
Seán Boylan

References

External links
 UCD Official Website
 Achievements
 Students UCD GAA Website
 UCD – The Real Story
 UCD Handball Club
 History of UCD GAA
 Dublin Club GAA

 
Gaelic games clubs in Dún Laoghaire–Rathdown
Gaelic football clubs in Dún Laoghaire–Rathdown
Hurling clubs in Dún Laoghaire–Rathdown
GAA
University Gaelic games clubs